Aaron James Booth (born 12 September 1996) is a New Zealand decathlete who won the gold medal in that event at the 2019 Summer Universiade.

Booth has represented New Zealand at youth and senior level at the Oceania Championships in Tahiti and Cairns, and at senior level at the World University Games in South Korea, Taipei and Napoli.
He was the 2013 Oceania Octathlon Champion, the 2014 New Zealand Under 20 Decathlon Champion, and the 2015 Australian Under 20 Decathlon Champion.

In 2019 Booth broke the New Zealand indoor Heptathlon record in Fayetteville with a score of 5819 points. He placed 8th at the NCAA Indoor champs in Birmingham Alabama. Booth then placed 6th at the NCAA Outdoor championships with a PB score of 7680 points. At the World University Games in Napoli he won the gold medal, adding to his bronze medal from the 2017 games, with another personal best score of 7827 points.

After a Covid interrupted season in 2020 Booth, representing Long Beach State University in California, won the 2021 Big West Outdoor Conference Championships (7520pts)  and at the NCAA Championships he broke the school record with a score of 7644pts, which placed 6th overall.

In March 2022 Booth won his first New Zealand Senior Decathlon title.

His best decathlon score of 7827pts, at Napoli ranks him fourth on the New Zealand decathlon "all time" list.

Achievements

Personal bests
New Zealand Athletics Rankings
Auckland Athletics Rankings
Tilastopaja
Tfrrs

Combined events

Track and field outdoor

Track and field indoor

References

New Zealand decathletes
1996 births
Living people
Place of birth missing (living people)
Universiade medalists in athletics (track and field)
Kansas State Wildcats men's track and field athletes
Universiade gold medalists for New Zealand
Universiade bronze medalists for New Zealand
Competitors at the 2015 Summer Universiade
Medalists at the 2017 Summer Universiade
Universiade gold medalists in athletics (track and field)
Medalists at the 2019 Summer Universiade
Long Beach State Beach men's track and field athletes